= Frank R. Milliken =

American business executive

- Born: January 25, 1914
- Died: 4 December 1991
- Known for: Business person

Frank R. Milliken (born 25 January 1914) was an American businessperson.

== Early life and education ==
Milliken was born on January 25, 1914, in Malden, Massachusetts. He received a degree in mining engineering from the Massachusetts Institute of Technology in 1934.

== Career ==
Milliken presided over Kennecott, based in New York City during the nationalization of the company's Chilean mines and stricter environmental regulations. In 1977, during his tenure, Kennecott acquired Carborundum.

In 1975, Miliken became a member of the National Academy of Engineering. He took retirement in 1979.

== Death ==
He died of a heart attack on December 4, 1991.
